The Bikou Dam is an embankment dam on the Bailong River just upstream of Bikou in Wen County, Gansu Province, China. Construction on the dam began in 1969, the generators were commissioned in 1976 and the dam was complete in 1977. The dam supports a 300 MW power station. The dam sustained some damage from the 2008 Sichuan earthquake.

See also

List of dams and reservoirs in China
List of major power stations in Gansu

References

Dams in China
Hydroelectric power stations in Gansu
Rock-filled dams
Dams completed in 1977